Nanjing Brain Bay also called Nanjing Brain Bay International Talent Community. The Launching Ceremony held at Nanjing in December 2020. The development area consists of four zones: Jianye District, Jiangbei District, Jiangning District and Zidong core area.

References

Organizations based in China
2020 establishments in China
Organizations established in 2020